The 1796 United States presidential election in New Jersey took place between November 4 and December 7, 1796, as part of the 1796 United States presidential election. The state legislature chose seven representatives, or electors to the Electoral College, who voted for President and Vice President.

During this election, New Jersey cast seven electoral votes for incumbent Vice President John Adams.

See also
 United States presidential elections in New Jersey

References

New Jersey
1796
1796 New Jersey elections